Whale was a ship that disappeared in 1816.

Whale was a sloop of 14 tons, built at Scotland Island, Pittwater, New South Wales in 1810.  In July 1816, under the command of George Winney, the Whale headed out of Sydney bound for Hawkesbury and was never seen again.  The master and two crew were presumed dead.

References

1810s missing person cases
1810 ships
1816 in Australia
1788–1850 ships of Australia
Shipwrecks of the Northern Sydney Region
Ships built in New South Wales
Maritime incidents in 1816
Coastal trading vessels of Australia
Sloops of Australia
Individual sailing vessels
Missing ships
Ships lost with all hands